Wyton is a hamlet in the East Riding of Yorkshire, England and is part of the civil parish of Bilton. Wyton leads from Bilton through to Sproatley. 

Wyton is a small farming village with few houses, it is used for farming because of its rich soil, and large, open space. Its history is small, but was a Quaker village in the 17th century. There are still signs of the Quakers, such as buried ploughing machines, buried clothes and the remains of the houses (more on the Sproatley track, leading from Sproatley to Coniston).
Wyton contains a Grade II listed Wesleyan Methodist Church, a milestone and a hall but there are no schools, public houses, post offices, hotels, public telephones or sports centres.
Wyton is usually called a hamlet because it is even smaller than a village.

References

External links

Villages in the East Riding of Yorkshire
Holderness